, also romanized as Kareki, was a  after Shōchū and before Gentoku. This period spanned the years from April 1326 through August 1329.

Change of era
 1326 : The new era name was created to mark an event or series of events. The previous era ended and the new one commenced in Shōchū 3.

Events of the Karyaku era
 March 8, 1327 (Karyaku 2, 14th day of the 2nd month): There is a total eclipse of the moon.

Notes

References
 Nussbaum, Louis-Frédéric and Käthe Roth. (2005).  Japan encyclopedia. Cambridge: Harvard University Press. ;  OCLC 58053128
 Titsingh, Isaac. (1834). Nihon Odai Ichiran; ou,  Annales des empereurs du Japon.  Paris: Royal Asiatic Society, Oriental Translation Fund of Great Britain and Ireland. OCLC 5850691
 Varley, H. Paul. (1980). A Chronicle of Gods and Sovereigns: Jinnō Shōtōki of Kitabatake Chikafusa. New York: Columbia University Press. ;  OCLC 6042764
 Xu, Zhentao and David W. Pankenier, Yaotiao Jiang. (2000).  East-Asian Archaeoastronomy: Historical Records of Astronomical Observations of China, Japan and Korea. London: CRC Press.

External links 

 National Diet Library, "The Japanese Calendar" -- historical overview plus illustrative images from library's collection

Japanese eras
1320s in Japan